The Australian two-dollar coin is the highest-denomination coin of the Australian dollar. It was first issued on 20 June 1988, having been in planning since the mid-1970s. It replaced the Australian two-dollar note due to having a longer circulatory life.
The only "mint set only" year was 1991.

$2 coins are legal tender for amounts not exceeding 10 times the face value of the coin for any payment of a debt.

Design
In accordance with all other Australian coins, the obverse features the portrait of the reigning monarch, who during the lifetime of the coin has only been Queen Elizabeth II. From 1988 to 1998 the portrait of her was by Raphael Maklouf before being replaced in the following year by one sculpted by Ian Rank-Broadley. Since 2019, the effigy of Elizabeth II by artist Jody Clark has been released into circulation.

Designed by Horst Hahne, the reverse depicts an Aboriginal Elder, a Walpiri-Anmatyerre man of the Northern Territory of Australia, inspired by an Ainslie Roberts drawing of Gwoya Tjungurrayi, also known as One Pound Jimmy. Tjungarrayi was one of the few survivors of one of the last recognised massacres of Aboriginal people by the British- the 1928 Coniston massacre in central Australia. However, the design is ‘not intended’ to depict any person in particular. The design also incorporates the Southern Cross and native grasstrees. 

The initials of its designer, Horst Hahne, were removed from the design from 1990 onwards. 1988 and 1989 are the only year dated two dollars with the initials. In spite of this, there are many false claims on the internet that coins with initials are worth up to $10,000.

All two-dollar coins have been struck at the Royal Australian Mint in Canberra. 160.9 million coins were minted in the first year of issue. It has been issued in all years since except 1991, with an average mintage of 22 million coins per annum from 1989 to 2008.

In 2012, the Australian mint released the first ever different designed two-dollar coin. It features a poppy flower, with the words Lest we Forget and Remembrance Day in the background of the coin. There had been no commemorative designs for this issue, until the 2012 Remembrance coin was minted. Along with the 2012 Remembrance coin was a coin with the same text and image but the centre poppy was red with a black centre. It was therefore the first coloured circulating coin in Australia. 

On 21 June 2013, a third commemorative two-dollar coin was launched by the Royal Australian Mint. This coin, commemorating the 60th anniversary of the coronation of Queen Elizabeth II, featured a purple circle bordering St Edward's Crown.

As a part of the 100 years of Anzac Day a coin programme launched by the Royal Australian Mint, two separate coloured coins were released. The first was released in 2014, it featured two green circles in the middle of the coin and a dove in the centre. The word Remembrance was stretched across the top of the coin. In 2015, the fourth circulating coloured coin in Australia was released. It includes red stripes much like the 2013 Queen Coronation coin. It also features five crosses amongst poppies and the words Lest we Forget in the centre. A fifth coin was also released in 2015. It is sunset orange and it features a sun in the centre with birds and the Flanders Field poem in the background.

In 2016 a commemorative coin was issued for the Rio Olympic Games. Five Coins were issued for circulation via Woolworths and were made available in packs of the 5 coins on 27 July 2016. A Paralympic Games coin was issued on 22 August 2016.

When the coin was introduced there were complaints that the coin was too small for its value and was easily lost, or counterfeited by placing two 5-cent pieces together and colouring them gold. However, with an uninterrupted milling on the 5-cent, and the 2 dollars having 5 grooves in 4 lots separated by 7 mm length of the side, identification is easy. It has the same size and milling as the 10 Swedish kronor.

Its smaller size in comparison to the $1 coin can lead to confusion for visitors from outside Australia.

Minting figures
The coin has only been struck at the Royal Australian Mint in Canberra, the nation's capital. The only year without production was 1991 (due to the large number issued for the coin's introduction in 1988).

Commemorative coins

See also

 Coins of the Australian dollar

References

External links
 List of Australian $2 circulating coins
 Australian Decimal Currency

Currencies introduced in 1988
Decimal coins of Australia
Two-base-unit coins